The Jessamine Stakes is a Grade II American thoroughbred horse race for two-year-old filles over a distance of  miles on the turf held annually in early October at Keeneland Race Course in Lexington, Kentucky during the fall meeting.

History

The event was inaugurated on 22 October 1991 as the Green River Stakes and was won by the second favorite Shes Just Super who was ridden by US Hall of Fame jockey Pat Day in a time of 1:44.91. The name of the event was named after the Green River a tributary of the Ohio River that rises in Lincoln County in south-central Kentucky. The event was created in parallel with the Hopemont Stakes which was run one day later for two-year-olds regardless of sex.

The event was run in two divisions in 1994.

In 2003 the event was renamed to the Jessamine County Stakes – Jessamine County is near Lexington and is considered part of the Lexington-Fayette metropolitan area. In 2005 the event was renamed to the Jessamine Stakes.

In 2009, the race was moved from the turf to the main all weather track due to weather conditions. 

The American Graded Stakes Committee made it a Graded stakes race for the first time in 2011 and was upgraded to Grade II status in 2018.

The race is currently part of the Breeders' Cup Challenge series and has been sponsored by JP Morgan Chase since 2006. The winner automatically qualify for the Breeders' Cup Juvenile Fillies Turf.

Records
Speed record: 
 1:40.86  – Aunt Pearl (IRE) (2020)

Margins
 lengths – Sweet Melania  (2019)

Most wins by an owner
 3 – William A. Carl (1991, 1997, 2003)
 3 – Kenneth L. Ramsey (1994, 2000, 2014)

Most wins by a jockey
 5 – Pat Day (1991, 1996, 1998, 1999, 2001)

Most wins by a trainer
 4 – Kenneth G. McPeek (1993, 2003, 2009, 2010)
 4 – Todd Pletcher (2002, 2004, 2005, 2019)

Winners

Legend:

See also 
 List of American and Canadian Graded races

References

Keeneland horse races
Flat horse races for two-year-old fillies
Turf races in the United States
Breeders' Cup Challenge series
Graded stakes races in the United States
Grade 2 stakes races in the United States
Recurring events established in 1991
1991 establishments in Kentucky